Salvador Nocetti was an Argentine manager,  born in Buenos Aires, Argentina. (18 July 1913 - 9 August 1986). He was a soccer player (midfielder) and a football coach.

Club career
He was top-tier champion with Santiago Morning in 1942, first title in the club’s history.

Once retired from football, he managed Audax Italiano (1947–1948), when reached a league title, then in 1950, he managed Universidad de Chile (where obtained poor results and failed to complete his period), in 1954 to América de Rancagua (team which then merged with O'Higgins Braden to make way to O'Higgins F.C.), and in late 60s to the Chile national team (1967–1968) and Santiago Morning in 1969.

Honours

Club

Footballer
Santiago Morning
 Primera División de Chile: 1942

Manager
Audax Italiano
 Primera División de Chile: 1948

References

Living people
Argentine footballers
Argentine football managers
Santiago Morning footballers
Audax Italiano managers
Universidad de Chile managers
Chile national football team managers
Santiago Morning managers
Chilean Primera División managers
Expatriate footballers in Chile
Year of birth missing (living people)
Association football midfielders
Naturalized citizens of Chile
Footballers from Buenos Aires